San Miguel de Velasco or simply San Miguel is a town in the Santa Cruz Department, Bolivia. It is the capital of San Miguel Municipality, the second municipal section of José Miguel de Velasco Province. It is known as part of the Jesuit Missions of the Chiquitos, which was declared a World Heritage Site in 1990, as a former Jesuit Reduction. The wood and adobe church has an elaborate interior. 

At the time of census 2001 it had a population of 4,484.

It is served by San Miguel South Airport.

History
In 1721, the mission of San Miguel was founded by the Jesuit missionary Felipe Suárez after San Rafael had grown too large.

Languages

San Miguel de Velasco is home to the speakers of Migueleño Chiquitano, a critically endangered variety of the Chiquitano language which is now remembered only by several dozen elderly people. Camba Spanish is the most commonly used everyday language.

Religious traditions
In San Miguel de Velasco, Catholic homilies are traditionally recited in an early form of Migueleño Chiquitano on certain religious occasions. This practice can be traced back to the Jesuit reductions of the 18th century, and the texts of the homilies have been transmitted (both orally and in the written form) across generations. The homilies have been extensively studied by Severin Parzinger, who has published a compilation thereof.

See also
 List of Jesuit sites
 List of the Jesuit Missions of Chiquitos

References

External links
 San Miguel de Velasco: description of Jesuit mission with pictures and information
 Map of José Miguel de Velasco Province

Populated places in Santa Cruz Department (Bolivia)
World Heritage Sites in Bolivia
Jesuit Missions of Chiquitos
Populated places established in 1721